This is a list of the current 24 members of the National Council of Monaco. The current members were elected in the 2018 general election.

References

Monaco
 
Nationsal Council members